Ballerin is a small village between Garvagh and Ringsend in County Londonderry, Northern Ireland. It is located within Causeway Coast and Glens district. It includes Saint Columba's Catholic primary school and Saint Mary's Catholic church.

Name
The village lies within a townland that has a similar name. The village's name is usually spelt Ballerin, while the townland's name is usually spelt Boleran. Earlier spellings of these names include Ballyerin (1654) and Ballyirin (1613). All are believed to come . However, the local Gaelic Athletic Association club uses the Irish name Baile Iarainn, meaning "townland/settlement of iron".

Parish
Ballerin is in Errigal civil parish and St Mary's is in the Derry Diocese, covering about half the Catholic parish of Garvagh.

Sport
Ballerin is the focal point for a number of sports in the area including Errigal Boxing Club, Irish Dancing, indoor bowling, Camogie and Gaelic games.
Ballerin GAC

References

Villages in County Londonderry
Causeway Coast and Glens district